Gudow-Sterley is a former Amt ("collective municipality") in the district of Lauenburg, in Schleswig-Holstein, Germany. It is situated approximately 16 km south of Ratzeburg, and 35 km south of Lübeck. Its seat was in Gudow.

The Amt Gudow-Sterley consisted until 2006 of the following municipalities (population in 2005 in brackets):

Besenthal (75)
Brunsmark (153)
Göttin (55)
Grambek (393)
Gudow * (1,652)
Hollenbek (450)
Horst (256)
Klein Zecher (248)
Langenlehsten (156)
Lehmrade (463)
Salem (560)
Seedorf (529)
Sterley (971)

Ämter in Schleswig-Holstein